Hide Your Smiling Faces is a 2013 American drama film written and directed by Daniel Patrick Carbone about the story of two brothers who have their summer vacation ruined by a tragedy. The film stars Ryan Jones, Nathan Varnson, Colm O'Leary, Thomas Cruz, Christina Starbuck and Chris Kies. The film was released on March 25, 2014, by Tribeca Film.

Cast
Ryan Jones as Tommy
Nathan Varnson as Eric
Colm O'Leary as Ian's Father
Thomas Cruz as Tristan
Christina Starbuck as Mother
Chris Kies as Father
Andrew M. Chamberlain as Blake
Clark Middleton as Religious Man
Ivan Tomic as Ian

Release
The film premiered at the 63rd Berlin International Film Festival on February 10, 2013. The film was released on March 25, 2014, by Tribeca Film.

Reception 
On review aggregator website Rotten Tomatoes, the film holds an approval rating of 84% based on 49 reviews. The site's critical consensus reads, "Its meditative pace and low-key approach may prove too ponderous for some, but Hide Your Smiling Faces will cast a potent spell on viewers patient enough to let it unfold."

References

External links
 

2013 films
American drama films
2013 drama films
2010s English-language films
2010s American films